Slate is a surname. Notable people with the surname include:

Cody Slate (born 1987), American football player
Jenny Slate (born 1982), American actress and comedian
Jeremy Slate (1926–2006), American actor
John Slate (1913–1967), American lawyer

Fictional characters
Mr. Slate, a character from the animated television series The Flintstones